= Hickory Fork, Virginia =

Unincorporated community in Virginia, United States

Coordinates: 38°03′24″N 77°13′39″W

Hickory Fork is an unincorporated community in Caroline County, in the U.S. state of Virginia.
